is a 1995 role-playing video game developed by Produce! and published by Enix for the Super Famicom. The video game was only released in Japan. Mystic Ark has strong similarities to the games The 7th Saga and Brain Lord, also developed by Produce and distributed by Enix. The game was being localized for a North American release under the title 7th Saga II, but the release was cancelled.

Gameplay
The game plays mostly as a standard Japanese role-playing game. The player controls the main character from an overhead perspective as the player traverses many worlds with towns and dungeons. The game features random battles that when the player wins will receive experience points that when accumulated will allow the player to reach the next level of experience.

When certain levels of experience have been gained the player will learn spells or techniques. The unique feature of the gameplay is that when the player receives two certain arks, the power ark and the wisdom ark, the player is then allowed to pick two partners of their liking that are located within the temple as figurines.

Plot
The game's plot involves one of two characters that the player can choose, Remeer or Ferris. The chosen hero awakens in a temple, on an unknown island. As the player explores the temple, it is discovered that, in order to make it home, he/she must travel to different worlds that lie within the temple and find the different arks that lie within each world. When the player retrieves all the arks, he/she is given access to the final area of the temple, to face the final boss and finally return home.

Each different world has its own specific storyline, involving Miriene the witch, Reeshine the grappler, Lux the tetujin, Kamiwoo the ogre, Meisia the priestess and Tokio the ninja. As such, the game plays out more of an anthology of stories with the temple tying the story as a whole together.

Audio
Mystic Ark'''s music was composed by Akihiko Mori. The game featured 30 tracks of music and was released on 2 discs with the game's original music and with arranged versions of certain tracks.

Sequel
A sequel titled Mystic Ark: Maboroshi Gekijo'' (まぼろし劇場; "Theatre of Illusions") was released for the PlayStation in 1999. Akihiro Yamada returned as the character designer. Despite the original game being a role-playing video game, the sequel was an adventure game instead.

References

External links
 
 Mystic Ark at GameFAQs

1995 video games
Enix games
Fantasy video games
Japan-exclusive video games
Produce! games
Single-player video games
Square Enix franchises
Super Nintendo Entertainment System games
Super Nintendo Entertainment System-only games
Video games developed in Japan
Video games featuring female protagonists